Youngstown is a former Pennsylvania Railroad station in Youngstown, Ohio. This station was preceded by another depot, which was condemned and demolished in 1949. Construction of this station began in February 1948, and the completed building was dedicated on March 15, 1949.The building was designed by Walker & Weeks, architects of Cleveland, Ohio and built by the Heller-Murray Company of Youngstown, Ohio at a cost of $350,000, or approximately $4.4 million in 2022 US dollars.This station closed in 1965, with the termination of remaining commuter service between Youngstown and Euclid Avenue station in Cleveland. Ownership of the Lordstown Secondary as well as the station passed from Penn Central to the Baltimore and Ohio Railroad, Conrail, and is currently owned by Norfolk Southern. The station itself was acquired by Phantom Fireworks and previously used as a firework showroom.

Gallery

References

Former Pennsylvania Railroad stations
Mahoning County, Ohio
Former railway stations in Ohio
Railway stations in the United States opened in 1949
Railway stations closed in 1965